Rodenstock Photo Optics traces its origins to a mechanical workshop founded in 1877 by Josef Rodenstock and his brother Michael in Würzburg, Germany. The company relocated to Munich by 1884 and became an important manufacturer of both corrective lenses for glasses and camera lenses by the early 1900s. These two lines began to diverge in the 1960s as the center of photographic lens manufacturing shifted to Japan; the ophthalmic business continued as Rodenstock GmbH while the remaining camera lens business was repositioned to serve the large format and industrial precision optics markets, then spun off in 1996 as Rodenstock Präzisionsoptik. Since then, the precision optics brand has been acquired in succession by LINOS Photonics (Göttingen, 2000), Qioptiq Group (Luxembourg, 2006), and Excelitas Technologies (2013).

Photographic lenses produced by Rodenstock during and since the 20th century include the brands Ysarex, Heligon, Eurygon, Rotelar, Apo-Ronar, Rodagon, and Grandagon for many different lens mounts including M42, Deckel, and large format lens boards.

Corporate history
Rodenstock pivoted to professional photography and enlarging optics markets in the 1970s.

Products

Photographic lenses
Photographic lenses were sold initially with the G. Rodenstock brand. These featured a symmetric four-element, four-group design and an angle of view of approximately 90°. The Pantogonal has a symmetric two-element design similar to the Goerz .

In the 1920s, Heinrich Kühn and  designed the two-element Anachromat Kühn soft-focus lens, which was licensed by Rodenstock and marketed as the Tiefenbildner-Imagon from 1928. The Imagon remained in the lineup for decades.

Rodenstock was one of the primary brands supplying lenses for the Kodak Retina line of fixed- and interchangeable-lens 35 mm cameras after World War II, alongside Schneider Kreuznach and Kodak. At about the same time in the mid- to late-1950s, Rodenstock was supplying lenses to Carl Braun Camera-Werk (for the Colorette Super II and Paxette Reflex) and Iloca (for the Electric). Rodenstock offered retrofocus/inverted telephoto wide-angle lenses (Eurygon, Eurynar, and Heligaron), Tessar-type normal lenses (Ysarex), and Sonnar-type telephoto lenses (Rotelar).

By 1963, Rodenstock had returned to supplying the large format professional photography market, offering Ysarex (Tessar-type, four-element/three-group [4e/3g]) and Heligon (high-speed) normal lenses, Grandagon (Biogon-type, eight-element/four-group [8e/4g]) wide-angle lenses, Rotelar telephoto lenses, Imagon [2e/1g] soft-focus lenses, and Apo-Ronar [symmetric 4e/4g] process/macro lenses, optimized for 1:1 reproduction. In addition, Rodenstock was producing Omegaron lenses for enlargers. The Ysarex and Heligon were consolidated into the Sironar line, a symmetric [6e/4g] Double-Gauss lens design, and the Rotelar had been dropped by the 1970s. The Geronar line [3e/3g] was introduced as a lower-priced alternative to the Sironar in the late 1970s or early 1980s.

The Sironar line was reformulated and updated with newer low-dispersion glass chemistry to improve resolution and add compatibility with digital camera backs and at Photokina 2010, Rodenstock unveiled their Digaron line of lenses, designed to cover the smaller sensors in digital backs.

References

External links
 Official website: 

Photography companies of Germany
1877 establishments
1996 establishments